The Mist Mountain Formation is a geologic formation of latest Jurassic to earliest Cretaceous age in the Western Canada Sedimentary Basin that is present in the southern and central Canadian Rockies. It was named for outcrops along the western spur of Mist Mountain in Alberta by D.W. Gibson in 1979. The Mist Mountain Formation contains economically important coal seams that have been mined in southeastern British Columbia and southwestern Alberta.

Lithology 
The Mist Mountain Formation consists of interbedded light to dark grey siltstone, silty shale, mudstone, and sandstone, with localized occurrences of chert- and quartzite-pebble conglomerate and conglomeratic sandstone, as well as a series of economically important coal seams.

Environment of deposition 
The Mist Mountain Formation is part of the Kootenay Group, an eastward-thinning wedge of sediments derived from the erosion of newly uplifted mountains to the west. The sediments were transported eastward by river systems and deposited in a variety of fluvial channel, floodplain, swamp, coastal plain and deltaic environments along the western edge of the Western Interior Seaway.

Thickness and distribution 
The Mist Mountain Formation is present in the front ranges and foothills of the southern and central Canadian Rockies. It extends from the Canada–US border to north of the North Saskatchewan River. Farther to the east it was truncated by pre-Aptian erosion.

Relationship to other units 
The Mist Mountain Formation is the middle unit of the Kootenay Group. It rests conformably on the cliff-forming sandstones of the Moose Mountain Member of the Morrissey Formation, and is conformably overlain by the Elk Formation. In the eastern foothills, the Elk Formation has been removed by erosion and the Mist Mountain Formation is unconformably overlain by the Cadomin Formation. North of the North Saskatchewan River, the Mist Mountain Formation grades into the Nikanassin Formation. Correlation south of the Canada–United States border is uncertain.

Paleontology and age 

Plant fossils from the Mist Mountain Formation include remains of ferns, cycads, cycadeoids, ginkgos, and extinct conifers. No remains of flowering plants have been reported. Indeterminate fossil ornithischian tracks are also known from the formation. None of the fossils are sufficiently time-sensitive to date the formation precisely.

Coal resources 
Seams occur throughout the formation, and some of the seams near the base for the formation are regionally extensive.

The formation was strongly folded and faulted during the Laramide Orogeny, which brought the coal to surface in many places. This also produced localized thickening and thinning of the coal in some areas due to shearing and fault-repetition of the seams, especially in the cores of folds and flexures.

Mist Mountain coal generally has a low sulphur content and coal rank typically ranges from high- to medium-volatile bituminous in the south, and from low-volatile bituminous to semi-anthracite in the north. As of 2019, it is being produced from large open-pit mines near Sparwood and Elkford, British Columbia, and the majority of it is exported to international markets for use as coking coal. Mist Mountain coal was formerly mined in British Columbia near Fernie, Hosmer, and Corbin; at several locations in the Crowsnest Pass area of Alberta; and at Canmore, Alberta, in many cases by underground mining methods.

See also 
 List of dinosaur-bearing rock formations
 List of stratigraphic units with ornithischian tracks
 Indeterminate ornithischian tracks

References 

Geologic formations of Canada
Upper Jurassic Series
Stratigraphy of Alberta
Cretaceous Alberta
Cretaceous British Columbia
Stratigraphy of British Columbia
Lower Cretaceous Series of North America
Ichnofossiliferous formations